Matti Juhani Niemi (born 6 June 1937) is a Finnish rowing coxswain.

He was born in Viljakkala. At the 1956 Summer Olympics he coxed the Finnish boat that won the bronze medal in the coxed four event.

References

1937 births
Living people
People from Ylöjärvi
Finnish male rowers
Coxswains (rowing)
Olympic rowers of Finland
Rowers at the 1956 Summer Olympics
Olympic bronze medalists for Finland
Olympic medalists in rowing
Medalists at the 1956 Summer Olympics
European Rowing Championships medalists
Sportspeople from Pirkanmaa